This is a list of flag bearers who have represented Venezuela at the Olympics.

Flag bearers carry the national flag of their country at the opening ceremony of the Olympic Games.

See also
Venezuela at the Olympics

Notes

References

Venezuela at the Olympics
Venezuela
Olympic flagbearers